Jacob Prai was previously the Head of the Senate of West Papua Provisional Government proclaimed in Great Waris, border area between Papua New Guinea and West Papua, Prai's homeland.

References

West Papuan independence activists
West Papuan expatriates in Sweden
Living people
Place of birth missing (living people)
Year of birth missing (living people)